There You'll Be is an international greatest hits album by country artist Faith Hill. It was released on October 8, 2001 in the United Kingdom and Australia only due to the success of Hill's latest singles from the albums Faith and Breathe. The album receives its name from the single "There You'll Be" which was recorded by Hill as the soundtrack for the movie Pearl Harbor. The single was also received well internationally.

Track listing

Personnel
 Stephanie Bentley – backing vocals
 Bekka Bramlett – backing vocals
 Mike Brignardello – bass
 Larry Byrom – acoustic guitar
 Marcus Cliff – bass
 The Duke Quartet – strings
 Glen Duncan – fiddle
 Stuart Duncan – fiddle
 David Foster – keyboards
 Paul Franklin – steel guitar
 Sonny Garrish – steel guitar
 Aubrey Haynie – fiddle
 Mark Johns – guitar
 Jeffrey C. King – electric guitar
 Michael Landau – electric guitar
 Paul Leim – drums
 B. James Lowry – acoustic guitar
 Brent Mason – electric guitar
 Steve Nathan – keyboards
 Beth Nielsen Chapman – backing vocals
 Rich Pagano – drums
 Tim Pierce – guitar
 John Robinson – drums
 Chris Rodriguez – backing vocals
 Tony Shanahan – bass
 Ira Siegel – guitar
 Gary Smith – piano
 Michael Thompson – electric guitar
 Lonnie Wilson – drums
 Glenn Worf – bass

Charts

Weekly charts

Year-end charts

Certifications

Personnel

 Larry Beaird – acoustic guitar
 Stephanie Bentley – background vocals
 Bekka Bramlett – background vocals
 Mike Brignardello – bass guitar
 Larry Byrom – acoustic guitar
 David Campbell – string arrangements, conductor
 Beth Neilson Chapman – background vocals
 Duke Quartet – strings
 Glen Duncan – fiddle
 Stuart Duncan – fiddle
 Felipe Elgueta – synthesizer programming
 Tabitha Fair – background vocals
 David Foster – keyboards
 Paul Franklin – steel guitar

 Byron Gallimore – synthesizer strings
 Sonny Garrish – steel guitar
 Duane Hamilton – background vocals
 Camille Harrison – background vocals
 Aubrey Haynie – fiddle
 Faith Hill – lead vocals
 Dann Huff – electric guitar
 Michael Landau – electric guitar
 Andy Lee – programming
 Paul Leim – drums
 Love to Infinity – instrumentation on track 4
 B. James Lowry – acoustic guitar, electric guitar
 Terry McMillan – percussion

 Brent Mason – electric guitar
 Gene Miller – background vocals
 Jamie Muhoberac – programming
 Steve Nathan – keyboards, organ, piano, synthesizer
 Richard Pagano – drums
 Richard Page – background vocals
 Kim Parent – background vocals
 Sherree Ford-Payne – background vocals
 Tim Pierce – electric guitar
 John "J.R." Robinson – drums
 Chris Rodriguez – background vocals
 William Ross – string arrangements
 Tony Shanahan – bass guitar

 Ira Siegel – acoustic guitar
 Gary Smith – piano
 Sound of Africa – background vocals
 Joe Spivey – fiddle
 Kenneth "Scat" Springs – background vocals
 Michael Thompson – electric guitar
 Rosaline Thompson – background vocals
 Percy Travis III – background vocals
 John Willis – electric guitar
 Dennis Wilson – background vocals
 Lonnie Wilson – drums
 Glenn Worf – bass guitar
 Curtis Wright – background vocals
 Curtis Young – background vocals

References

Faith Hill albums
Albums produced by Dann Huff
Albums produced by Byron Gallimore
2001 greatest hits albums
Warner Records compilation albums